Scarab was a professional fraternity in the field of architecture. It was founded in 1909 at the University of Illinois at Urbana-Champaign as the first group of its type for architecture.

History 
Scarab was founded on February 25, 1909, at the University of Illinois at Urbana-Champaign. Its members were students of architecture, landscape architecture, or architectural engineering.

Annually, each chapter held an exhibition of its best work. Chapters also issued a bronze or silver medal annually for excellence in architectural design in a competition that was open to any student at it institution. The national fraternity sponsored the annual Scarab National Competition.

The fraternity was governed by a supreme council that met during the annual convention. Its publication was The Hieratic. It also published Scarab Bulletin twice a year.

Archival materials related to Scarab are housed at Carnegie Mellon University Libraries, Rensselaer Polytechnic Institute Archives, and the University of Illinois Archives.

It is unknown when most chapters ceased operations; The mother chapter, at Illinois, ceased activity circa 1971.

Chapter list 
Scarab's chapters were called temples. A list of its temples follows.

Notes

Notable members

 William Francis Cody, architect
 Raymond Eastwood, artist
 Robert A. Kennard, African American architect
 Robert E. Langdon Jr., architect
 Arthur Silvers, African American architect
 Louis Sullivan, architect
 Gordon Greenfield Wittenberg, architect

See also

 Professional fraternities and sororities

References

1909 establishments in Illinois
Student organizations established in 1909
Professional fraternities and sororities in the United States
Former members of Professional Fraternity Association
Architectural competitions
Architecture